Before its repeal, the State Sector Act 1988 defined what constituted the State sector organisations in New Zealand. It (along with accompanying marketisation reforms) substantially reshaped the shape of the public service and to some extent its culture. It granted ministers some role in the appointments of departmental chief executives.

The Public Service Association view is that, "By establishing the individual departmental chief executive as the employer, the Act set up one of the main mechanisms by which the old public service was broken up from the mid-1980s."

References

External links
Text of the Act

Statutes of New Zealand
1988 in New Zealand law